Prorasea  is a genus of moths of the family Crambidae.

Species
Prorasea fernaldi Munroe, 1974
Prorasea gracealis Munroe, 1974
Prorasea praeia (Dyar, 1917)
Prorasea pulveralis (Warren, 1892)
Prorasea sideralis (Dyar, 1917)
Prorasea simalis Grote, 1878

References

Natural History Museum Lepidoptera genus database

Evergestinae